Trestles Bridge, more formally known as Railroad Bridge 207.6 or the San Mateo Creek Bridge, is a low railroad viaduct on the coast of Southern California, in northern San Diego County near its border with Orange County. The bridge lies within San Onofre State Beach and gave its nickname to the famed Trestles surfing site at that beach.

Usage
The bridge, carrying a single railway track, forms part of the only rail connection between San Diego and the Greater Los Angeles area. The bridge is part of the LOSSAN Corridor, the second busiest segment of railway in the United States. Approximately 45 trains per day and 2.7 million people per year travel on the bridge; it is used by Amtrak's Pacific Surfliner trains, the Orange County Line of the Metrolink commuter rail service, and freight trains on the BNSF Railway. The bridge lies between the San Clemente Pier station to the north and the Oceanside Transit Center to the south. It crosses the San Mateo Creek.

History
A railroad first bridged the creek in this location in 1891. The nearby waves had already been surfed as early as 1937, and by 1951, local surfers had named the beach and its surf break "Trestles", after the bridge there.

In 1992, the railway line containing the bridge was purchased by the North County Transportation District from the Atchison, Topeka and Santa Fe Railway.

By 2007, inspectors determined that the northern segment of the bridge needed replacement. Salt from the beach environment had rotted the wooden support beams, they had been damaged by fires set by beachgoers, the creosote protecting the beams had been worn away, and the bridge did not meet seismic standards. Trains could not travel on the bridge at full speeds, and frequent bridge maintenance was costing US$250,000 per year. Construction began in 2010, and a new concrete replacement for this bridge segment opened in 2012 at a cost of eight million dollars, paid by federal funds from the American Recovery and Reinvestment Act of 2009.

Design
In order to protect the 2012 bridge segment against corrosion, its rebar was protected by an epoxy coating and calcium nitrite was added as a corrosion inhibitor to its reinforced concrete. The new concrete supports for the bridge structure are etched with letters spelling "Trestles", the nickname of the bridge.

References

Bridges in San Diego County, California
Railroad bridges in California
Bridges completed in 1941
Concrete bridges in California
Wooden bridges in California
Trestle bridges in the United States